Almukhametovo (Älmöxämät stantsiyahı) is a rural locality (a village of station) in Almukhametovsky Selsoviet, Abzelilovsky District, Bashkortostan, Russia. The population was 396 as of 2010. There are 8 streets.

Geography 
Almukhametovo is located 54 km southeast of Askarovo (the district's administrative centre) by road. Tselinny is the nearest rural locality.

References 

Rural localities in Abzelilovsky District